Byron Arthur Frisch (born December 17, 1976) is a former American football defensive end in the National Football League for the Dallas Cowboys and the New York Giants.  He played college football at Brigham Young University.

Early years
Frisch attended Bonita Vista High School, helping the team win 2 championships. He received league defensive player of the year and All-league honors as a senior. He also practiced wrestling.

College career
He accepted a football scholarship from Brigham Young University. He suffered a fractured ankle as a redshirt freshman, but was able to recover to start 8 games in the season, tallying 40 tackles, 3 sacks, one forced fumble and one fumble recovery. 

As a sophomore, he collected 57 tackles, 9 sacks (led the team), 3 forced fumbles and 2 fumble recoveries. As a junior, he registered 70 tackles (fourth on the team), 5 sacks, 14 quarterback hurries, one forced fumble and one fumble recovery. 

As a senior, he registered 55 tackles (17 for loss), 8 sacks, 14 quarterback hurries and 2 forced fumbles. He finished his career with 222 tackles (43 for loss), 25 sacks, 46 quarterback hurries, 7 forced fumbles and 4 fumble recoveries.

Professional career

Tennessee Titans
Frisch was selected by the Tennessee Titans in the third round (93rd overall) of the 2000 NFL Draft. As a rookie, he was declared inactive in all 16 games and also suffered from a foot injury. He was waived on September 2, 2001.

Dallas Cowboys
On September 24, 2001, he was signed as a free agent by the Dallas Cowboys. He was used mostly as a pass rush specialist, because he struggled defending the run, finishing with 8 tackles (one for loss), 3 sacks, one pass defensed, one quarterback pressure and one forced fumble. He was released on August 27, 2002.

New York Giants
The New York Giants signed him as a free agent on October 15, 2002, after Keith Hamilton was injured. He was cut on March 23, 2003.

San Francisco 49ers
On July 3, 2003, he was signed as a free agent by the San Francisco 49ers. He was released on August 26.

Personal life
In 2013, he was charged with conspiracy to commit mail fraud in California. He has 3 children and a wife. His oldest son is Colton, middle daughter is Chloe, and the youngest child names soren. Byron now lives running a solar company in San Marcos. The charges were dismissed in 2016.

References

External links
BYU Profile
Ranking the best defensive players in BYU history

1976 births
Living people
Sportspeople from Chula Vista, California
Players of American football from California
American football defensive ends
BYU Cougars football players
Tennessee Titans players
Dallas Cowboys players
New York Giants players